The Abbey of St. Peter in Assisi, Italy, is inhabited by a small community of monks belonging to the Benedictine Cassinese Congregation. They live according to the Rule of St. Benedict, summarized as "Ora et Labora".

Cistercian monks, monks Cassinesi came from the nearby monastery of San Pietro in Perugia, at the invitation of Pope Paul V in January 1613. The monastery has supported a hospital for the sick; an agricultural colony; and the Orphanage Ancajani (the name and linked all'Aate Ancajani), run by the Stigmata Sisters. The Benedictine monks of Cassino are still resident.

History
The foundation of the Monastery of San Pietro in Assisi is dated 970 A.D.; and is first documented in 1029 A.D. The early Church was a Cluniac monastery. The building was divided into a nave with two aisles with arches supported by columns, and raised presbytery over the crypt. The present building was built over the earlier foundation by Cistercian monks and consecrated by Pope Innocent IV in 1253  The complex can be identified by the dome and square bell tower.

Description

Façade
The Romanesque façade was completed in 1268. It is rectangular, with three entries, each surmounted in the second tier by three rose windows. The two sections are separated by a cornice of hanging arches. The central portal is flanked by two lions.  The rosettes contain hints of Gothic styling.

Interior
The interior has a central nave and two aisles in the Romanesque style, with Gothic influences. The aisles contain six tombs of the fourteenth or fifteenth century and the remains of frescoes from the same time. The Chapel of the Blessed Sacrament is in the Gothic style, with a triptych by Matteo da Gualdo. The presbytery is raised in a semicircular apse with adome over the crossing.  The interior was restored in 1954.

One of these tombs is for the venerable Don Antonio Pennacchi, diocesan priest of Assisi (1782- 1843). He is revered as "the Ave Marie priest." To the right of the tomb of Don Antonio is a twelfth century fresco of a young St. Benedict, patron of Europe with his head covered with a hood, holding the book of the Rule, supported by Saints Cyril and Methodius, apostles to the Slavs, and inventors of the Cyrillic alphabet.

On the right of the sanctuary is a staircase that descends to the crypt. The ancient sarcophagus of St. Vittorinoe and fellow martyrs are here.

At the center of the apse, stands a large wooden crucifix of the fifteenth century by an unknown craftsman.  The urn of San Vittorino (third century), bishop of Assisi and patron of the diocese, was made in 1954 for house his relics and those of other martyrs. It is under the high altar. In the presbytery, to the left is a statue of Our Lady in ceramic, created in 1981 by Francesco Vitali.

The ancient chapel in to the left side with the depiction of St. Vittorino, the Annunciation of Mary.

Just inside the entrance, to the left is the Chapel of the Rosary. The altar was rebuilt in 1831, and a painting of the Madonna del Rosario created. The framework and an unknown artist of 1611, depicting the Madonna of Pompeii.

Museum
The museum is under the monastery. Built on the Roman ruins, these older rooms are used for exhibitions. Of local importance is the Well of Martyrs where the bodies of San Vittorino and companions were thrown.  The museum displays a collection of art that includes ceramic works of Italian and foreign artists on the theme "St. Francis and the Nativity in contemporary art".

Nativity
Assisi and the peasant civilization
Created by Eraldo Marini for Christmas 2008 to help the public understand daily life in the country on the outskirts of Assisi, during the early years of the last century. Each piece is by hand.

References

Bibliography
 G. Troiano - A. Pompei, Illustrated Guide to Assisi, Franciscan Publishing House, Terni
 L. Santini, Assisi, Publishing Plurigraf, Terni-Narni

Roman Catholic churches in Assisi
Romanesque architecture in Umbria
13th-century Roman Catholic church buildings in Italy